The College of Arts and Sciences is the oldest and largest academic unit at American University in terms of student enrollment and faculty lines.  It was  established in 1893.  It offers more than 50 masters, doctoral, and certificate programs. The College of Arts and Sciences faculty includes nationally and internationally noted artists, scholars, and teachers, as well as students from all 50 states and 150 countries. It also administers the Katzen Arts Center and the Greenberg Theatre.

History
The "College  of Liberal Arts," as it was originally known, was first housed at Hurst Hall. The official name of the college changed several times in the mid-twentieth century:
In 1939,  it first took its current name as the "College of Arts and Sciences"
The name briefly changed again in 1953, becoming the "Undergraduate College"
Finally,  in 1959, the name returned to the "College of Arts  and Sciences"

During World War II, the American Red Cross' training program, Overseas and Domestic Workers School, was also housed in Hurst Hall.

The Dean's Office of the  College of Arts and Sciences moved  into the Asbury Building in 1960, where it remained until 1966. Gray Hall was home to the College of Arts and Sciences until the fall of 2001. It is currently housed in Battelle-Tompkins.

The Harold and Sylvia Greenberg Theatre was opened in 2003 and the Katzen Arts Center was opened in 2006.

Notes

American University
Educational institutions established in 1893
1893 establishments in Washington, D.C.
Liberal arts colleges at universities in the United States